The 2013–14 winter transfer window for English football transfers opened on 1 January and closed on 31 January. Additionally, players without a club may join at any time, clubs below Premier League level may sign players on loan at any time, and clubs may sign a goalkeeper on an emergency loan if they have no registered goalkeeper available. This list includes transfers featuring at least one Premier League or Football League Championship club which were completed after the end of the summer 2013 transfer window and before the end of the 2013–14 winter window.

Transfers

All players, and clubs without a flag are English. Note that while Cardiff City and Swansea City are affiliated with the Football Association of Wales and thus take the Welsh flag, they play in the English football league system, and so their transfers are included here.

 Player officially joined his club after the transfer window opened on 1 January 2014.
 Player officially joined his club on 28 February 2014.

References

Specific

Transfers Winter 2013-14
Winter 2013-14
English